Wang Hongbin (born 16 February 1915, date of death unknown) was a Chinese basketball player who competed in the 1936 Summer Olympics.

He was part of the Chinese basketball team, which was eliminated in the second round of the Olympic tournament. He played three matches.

External links

1915 births
Year of death missing
Chinese men's basketball players
Olympic basketball players of China
Basketball players at the 1936 Summer Olympics
Place of birth missing
Place of death missing
Republic of China men's national basketball team players